Lusomundo Action was a Portuguese premium movie channel that started airing on 16 April 2004 and it aired action and horror movies. It was the third channel on the Lusomundo network.
On 1 November 2007, the channel changed its name to TVC2. The channel is owned by PT Conteúdos, a television content producer that is owned by ZON Conteúdos.

Portuguese-language television networks
Defunct television channels in Portugal
Television channels and stations established in 2004
Television channels and stations disestablished in 2007
2004 establishments in Portugal
2007 disestablishments in Portugal